The Hendrix College Addition Neighborhood Historic District encompasses a predominantly residential area of Conway, Arkansas that was developed in the first half of the 20th century. Architecturally, the houses in the neighborhood represent a cross-section of styles popular in the period, from the Prairie School and English Revival, to post-World War II ranch houses. The land had been acquired by Hendrix College when it relocated to Conway in the 1890s, and was developed as a way to pay off some of the debts incurred because of the move. It was one of the city's first formally platted subdivisions.

The district was listed on the National Register of Historic Places in 2007.

See also
National Register of Historic Places listings in Faulkner County, Arkansas

References

Historic districts on the National Register of Historic Places in Arkansas
Colonial Revival architecture in Arkansas
Prairie School architecture
Geography of Faulkner County, Arkansas
Addition Neighborhood Historic District